The Krugersdrift Dam in the Modder River is 35 km northwest of Bloemfontein, Free State Province of South Africa with a capacity of 73.2 million cubic metres. It was built in 1970 with a wall length of 3114 m, height of 26 m and a surface area of 1 853 ha. The huge dam is very shallow and can lose its water in a short period of time due to usage and evaporation. The dam is situated in the Soetdoring Nature Reserve and holds yellowfish, Orange River mudfish, barbel and carp.

It is a popular birding venue with large numbers of South African shelduck, Spur-winged geese and Egyptian geese. Access to the reserve is from the Bloemfontein-Bultfontein road (R700) or from the Bloemfontein-Kimberley road (R64); the reserve is about 40 kilometres from Bloemfontein's city centre.

See also
List of reservoirs and dams in South Africa
List of rivers of South Africa

References 

 List of South African Dams from the South African Department of Water Affairs

Dams in South Africa
Dams completed in 1970
Arch-gravity dams
1970 establishments in South Africa